The 1994 Houston Oilers season was the 35th season overall the Oilers played and their 25th with the National Football League (NFL), and was part of the 1994 NFL season.

Despite finishing with a 12–4 record and a first-round bye the previous season, team owner Bud Adams made good on a threat to break up the team if they did not win the Super Bowl. The two biggest losses the Oilers suffered were the trading of Warren Moon, the team’s longtime starting quarterback, to the Minnesota Vikings and the departure of defensive coordinator Buddy Ryan, who was hired to coach the Arizona Cardinals. With Moon being replaced by career backup Cody Carlson and the defense left without its leader, the 1994 Oilers went into a tailspin despite returning several of their explosive offensive players such as Ernest Givins and Haywood Jeffires. The team started out with only one win in their first ten games, which led to head coach Jack Pardee and offensive coordinator Kevin Gilbride being fired. Jeff Fisher, who had just joined the team that year as Ryan's replacement as defensive coordinator, was promoted to head coach. 

Carlson did not last the season as he suffered a series of injuries that proved to be career ending. Billy Joe Tolliver ended up making the most starts of any Oilers quarterback, losing all seven of his starts. Neither Tolliver, Carlson, or third quarterback Bucky Richardson threw for more than six touchdowns (Carlson only managed one in five starts) and Tolliver and Carlson threw more interceptions than touchdowns. Running back Gary Brown could not repeat his 1,000-yard total from the previous year, managing only 648. Givins, who had recorded nearly 900 receiving yards in 1993, fell to 521 in 1994 while seeing his receptions total drop to 35. Jeffires' numbers improved slightly, and he led the Oilers in receiving touchdowns with six, but he was not elected to the Pro Bowl as he had been in 1993. Slaughter, meanwhile, only caught two touchdowns, which was his lowest total to that point in his career. The offense finished last in the league in points scored and 26th in total yardage.

The defense, which lost several of its key pieces from the previous season including its two leaders in sacks, also fell off. After giving up the fourth-lowest point total in 1993, the Oilers allowed a total of 352 points in 1994. Despite that, three players recorded at least six sacks with Lamar Lathon leading with 8.5. Darryll Lewis recorded five interceptions in his first full season as a starter, with fellow cornerback Cris Dishman getting four and returning one for a touchdown, and safety Marcus Robertson adding three of his own. The defense also managed to improve on their total yardage allowed from 1993, moving up from ninth in that category despite finishing near the bottom of the league in points allowed.

When the season was over the Oilers stood at 2–14, tying their 1983 squad with the team’s fewest wins in a sixteen game season and the second-fewest overall, with the 1972, 1973, 1982 squads only winning once each season. The ten-game swing is the worst season-to-season drop in games won in NFL history, which would later be tied by the 2013 Houston Texans. Seven of their fourteen losses came by three points or fewer.

Although the Oilers finished with the worst record that season, they did not receive the #1 pick in the 1995 NFL Draft due to the entry of the expansion Carolina Panthers and Jacksonville Jaguars into the league (under NFL rules, a new team is automatically granted the first pick in their first draft, unless they decide to give it up as the Panthers would do). However, the news was not all negative. With the high pick the Oilers chose Steve McNair, who would go on to become one of the franchise’s all-time great players.

Offseason
After having imploded in the playoffs against Kansas City in the 1993 playoffs, the Oilers traded long-time quarterback Warren Moon to Minnesota, leaving Cody Carlson as the starter for the 1994 season. Carlson, however, was severely injured early in the season and would eventually retire due to said injuries after the season.

NFL Draft

Personnel

Staff

Roster

Regular season

Schedule

Game summaries

Week 14

    
    
    
    
    
    
    
    
    

This ninth successive defeat for the Oilers has the unusual distinction of being the most recent NFL game as of 2019 during which both teams scored a safety, and one of only eight since at least 1940.

Week 17

Standings

References

External links
 1994 Houston Oilers at Pro-Football-Reference.com

Houston Oilers seasons
Houston Oilers
Houston